Smile Before Death (/ translation: Smile of the Hyena) is a 1972 Italian giallo film written and directed by Silvio Amadio, and starring Rosalba Neri.

Plot
Marco, a bankrupt nobleman, is unhappily married to the wealthy Dorothy Emerson. Her best friend, Gianna, is his mistress. Marco murders his wife (making it appear to be suicide by slashing her throat with a shard of glass) and becomes the administrator of his wife's estate, with the proviso that Nancy, Dorothy's daughter from a previous marriage, takes over control when she turns twenty. Marco has retired to live with Gianna in a luxurious lakeshore villa.

Marco's daughter Nancy contacts him to notify him that she will be taking control of her mother's estate very soon. Nancy has been living in a boarding school for years and hadn't seen her mother for a long time. Gianna tries to encourage Marco to kill Nancy, since Marco's standard of living will drop severely once she takes over the estate. But Marco ends up falling in love with Nancy, which complicates the proceedings.

Cast 
Jenny Tamburi as Nancy Thompson
Silvano Tranquilli as Marco 
Rosalba Neri as  Gianna 
Dana Ghia as  Magda 
Zora Gheorgieva as  Dorothy Emerson
Hiram Keller as Paolo

See also        
 List of Italian films of 1972

References

4. Adrian Luther-Smith. Blood and Black Lace. Stray Cat Publishing, 1999.

External links

1970s Italian-language films
Giallo films
1970s crime thriller films
Films directed by Silvio Amadio
Films scored by Roberto Pregadio
1970s Italian films